On 19 May 1992 elections were held to the Kurdistan National Assembly, the parliament of the Kurdistan Region in Iraq. At the time, the National Assembly had 105 seats, of which 5 were reserved for the Assyrian community. Parties had to achieve more than 7% of the vote to be elected. There were 178 polling stations around the region.

The election resulted in a narrow victory for the Kurdish Democratic Party, which won 51 seats, its main rival, the Patriotic Union of Kurdistan's Alliance won 49 seats. However, due to fraud allegations KDP gave up one seat to the PUK so that each would have 50 seats, they proceeded to form a unity government which lasted until May 1994, when the Kurdish Civil War broke out.

On 4 June 1992, KDP Secretary General Jawhar Namiq Salim was elected Speaker of the Kurdistan National Assembly and prominent PUK member Fuad Masum was elected Prime Minister of Kurdistan Region.

Results

Governorate breakdown

Dahuk Governorate

Note: Dahuk included the Aqrah and Shekhan Districts which were officially part of Nineveh Governorate.

Erbil Governorate

Note: The Makhmour district was at this time still under control of the Iraqi government, no elections were held there.

As Sulaymaniya Governorate

Diyala Governorate

Only two areas in the Diyala Governorate were under Kurdish control: Darbandikhan and Khanaqin.

References

External links 
 Kurdistan National Assembly Parliament
 https://web.archive.org/web/20091026140537/http://geocities.com/capitolhill/congress/1154/parl.htm

1992 elections in Iraq
1992